Egede is the remains of a lunar impact crater that has been flooded by lava, leaving only the somewhat polygonal circumference of the rim protruding just above the mare. It was named after Dano-Norwegian natural historian Hans Egede. It is located on the southern edge of the Mare Frigoris, to the west of the crater Aristoteles. To the southwest is an arc of low mountains curving between the rims of Aristoteles and Eudoxus. The floor of Egede is flat and nearly featureless, except for a few tiny craterlets, including secondaries from Aristoteles (which are also present to the north and south of Egede). The surviving rim has a maximum altitude of 0.4 km above the surface.

Satellite craters
By convention these features are identified on lunar maps by placing the letter on the side of the crater midpoint that is closest to Egede.

References

 
 
 
 
 
 
 
 
 
 
 

Impact craters on the Moon